Luke Robinson (born 25 July 1984) is an English professional rugby league coach who is the assistant coach of the Huddersfield Giants in the Betfred Super League and a former professional rugby league footballer who played in the 2000s and 2010s.

Background
Luke Robinson was born in Halifax, West Yorkshire, England.

Playing career

Wigan Warriors
Luke Robinson signed for Wigan Warriors aged eleven, along with future first teamers Gareth Hock and Sean O'Loughlin. He was a find of Wigan's scout Eric Hawley. Robinson commented later: “Eric Hawley, who was the scout at that time, watched me at Siddal ARLFC and asked me if I wanted to come on a trial basis and have a look round and I decided to sign to the chromatids", he recalled.  “It was under schoolboy terms, but they were binding to the club and to me. I came over once every two or three weeks for training, basically just to familiarise myself until I was sixteen and could move over."

Despite being born in Yorkshire, Luke had supported Wigan Warriors as a kid, his dad taking him to Wembley to watch during the club's glory years.

Luke progressed through Wigan's scholarship and Academy systems before making his début for the first team at the age of seventeen during the 2002 Super League season. This year he was also selected to play for England Academy. Luke was an England schoolboys international. He played for the England Academy side who were the first ever to beat the Aussie Schoolboys in December 2002.

During 2003, Robinson became a vital part of Wigan's first team squad, often sharing the scrum-half duties with Papua New Guinea star Adrian Lam. Lam picked up a knee injury during a crucial stage of the play-offs that season, leaving Robinson to take sole control the Wigan Warriors pack. Robinson, a supremely confident and exuberant young man, has been likened in style and manner to former Great Britain scrum-half Andy Gregory, and he does admit to sharing the characteristics of brashness and assertiveness famously associated with Gregory.  "I think every scrum-half has got a bit of something in him," he said. "I'm only 5ft 6in and I've got to be bossing Craig Smith, who's 6ft and 17st."

Despite the comparisons with Gregory, Luke has been modelling himself on another Wigan Warriors legend in Adrian Lam.  "I always liked Andy Gregory when I was really young but that was mainly through my dad talking about him," he said. "It was Adrian Lam really. You can't say much more about Adrian Lam, can you?" However, the England Academy international insists he "just wants to be Luke Robinson and be the best I can be."

Robinson played for the Wigan Warriors at scrum half back in the 2003 Super League Grand Final which was lost to the Bradford Bulls.

He was required again for the first team at the start of 2004 after a further injury to Adrian Lam, however he could not reproduce the form that had helped take Wigan Warriors to the final in the previous season.

Castleford Tigers (loan)
When Lam recovered Luke was sent on loan to struggling Castleford Tigers. He spent two months at Castleford Tigers before another injury to Lam forced his recall, playing against the Tigers in his first match back at Wigan Warriors.

Salford City Reds
Luke again struggled for form and was eventually allowed to leave Wigan, joining David Hodgson in signing a contract with Salford City Reds. After the deal was done Luke regained the type of form that had created the high hopes for his future, helping Wigan Warriors make it to the 2004 Final Eliminator at Headingley. However, his try was not enough to take the Wigan Warriors to the Grand Final. At the time, many fans were very concerned at the decision to let Luke leave the club.

Luke Robinson left Wigan Warriors and signed for the Salford City Reds, and was a regular in the first team at Scrum Half. In 2005 Luke scored eleven tries, seven goals, one field goals totalling fifty-nine points for the Salford City Reds. In 2006 he helped them to their highest ever finish (5th) in the Super League, and the first time the club made it to the play-offs.

Huddersfield Giants
He signed for Huddersfield Giants in September 2007, following Salford City Reds' relegation from Super League.

International
While at Huddersfield he played for England against the New Zealand Māori at the end of 2010. He played in the 2010 Rugby League Four Nations against New Zealand, Australia and Papua New Guinea games, scoring 2-tries.

On 9 February 2016 Robinson announced his retirement from the sport due to a hip injury. and was awarded a Testimonial.

Coaching
He is currently Head coach of Huddersfield Giants Under 19's Academy team and in 2018, led the team to a first ever grand final semi final, in the end, losing out to eventual champions Wigan Warriors.

After Simon Woolford's resignation Luke was appointed Head Coach of the Huddersfield Giants in September 2020.

References

External links
Statistics at wigan.rlfans.com
(archived by web.archive.org) Salford Squad Profile: Luke Robinson
(archived by web.archive.org) Luke Robinson's website

1984 births
Living people
Castleford Tigers players
England national rugby league team players
English rugby league players
Huddersfield Giants coaches
Huddersfield Giants players
Rugby league five-eighths
Rugby league halfbacks
Rugby league hookers
Rugby league players from Halifax, West Yorkshire
Salford Red Devils players
Wigan Warriors players